Avalku Maranamilla (മലയാളം:അവൾക്കു മരണമില്ല) is a 1978 Indian Malayalam film, directed by Melattoor Ravi Varma. The film stars Prathapachandran, Baby Sumathi, Bahadoor and Janardanan in the lead roles. The film has musical score by G. Devarajan.

Cast
Prathapachandran
Baby Sumathi
Bahadoor
Janardanan
Kuthiravattam Pappu
M. G. Soman
P. R. Varalekshmi
Vidhubala

Soundtrack
The music was composed by G. Devarajan and the lyrics were written by Mankombu Gopalakrishnan.

References

External links
 

1978 films
1970s Malayalam-language films